Kavita Yadav (born 1986 in Bangalore) is an Indian woman sport shooter who won the bronze medal in Women's 10 m Air Rifle (Pairs) in 2010 Commonwealth Games.

She is from Karnataka.

References

External links
 

1986 births
Living people
Indian female sport shooters
Commonwealth Games medallists in shooting
Commonwealth Games bronze medallists for India
Shooters at the 2010 Commonwealth Games
Asian Games competitors for India
Shooters at the 2010 Asian Games
Sportswomen from Karnataka
21st-century Indian women
21st-century Indian people
Medallists at the 2010 Commonwealth Games